For the city in Quebec, see Sept-Îles, Quebec

Sept-Îles (French for seven islands) or  Jentilez (in Breton) is a small archipelago off the north coast of Brittany, in the Perros-Guirec commune of Côtes-d'Armor. This group of islands is home to an important bird reserve, and is the home of various seabirds, including northern gannets, cormorants, and members of the Alcidae family (puffins, common guillemots, razorbills). This is also a reserve for grey seals.

Islands of the Archipelago 
Despite its name, the Sept-Iles are only made up of five islands and a handful of rocks. The French name Sept-Iles derived from a misunderstanding of the old Breton name for the islands, the Sentiles. The name stuck, however, and two groups of reefs were designated as islands in order for the name to stay true. The 5 main islands (or Enez in Breton) are:

 Enez Bonno in Breton, Île Bono in French: the largest of the islands;
 Enez Plat in Breton, Île plate in French;
 Enez ar Breur or Jentilez in Breton, Île aux Moines in French: the only island accessible to the public, where you can find a lighthouse and the remains of a fort;
 Melbann in Breton, Île de Malban in French;
 Riouzig in Breton, Île Rouzic in French: the main spot for birds.

In addition to these islands, the two reefs are called ar Zerr in Breton, le Cerf in French (the deer), and Kostann.

Other islets include Enez ar Razhed (Rat island) and ar Moudennoù.

The isle of Taveeg (Tomé) is closer to the coast, and is not considered part of the archipelago.

Gallery

See also 
 Sept-Îles Lighthouse
 Battle of Sept-Îles

References

Islands of Brittany